Alexandra Alexandrovna Shiryayeva (born February 9, 1983) is a , , female beach volleyball player from Russia. She claimed the gold medal at the 2006 European Championships in The Hague, Netherlands, partnering with Natalya Uryadova.

At the 2008 Summer Olympics, she and her partner Natalya Uryadova were defeated in an historical game against Georgia while war was raging between the two countries. In an AP article by Jimmy Golan published on August 13, 2008, Alexandra Shiryayeva showed courage and grace in defeat by declaring “We just want to end the conflict, all the history between us was friendly.”

Playing partners
 Maria Bratkova
 Judith-Flores Yalovaya
 Anna Morozova
 Natalya Uryadova
 Anastasia Vasina

References

External links
 
 
 

1983 births
Living people
Russian beach volleyball players
Olympic beach volleyball players of Russia
Beach volleyball players at the 2008 Summer Olympics
Sportspeople from Saint Petersburg
Women's beach volleyball players